John Henry Lockett  (22 January 1891 – 25 May 2002) was the oldest man ever in Australia when he died aged 111 years, 123 days. As one of the last surviving veterans of World War I, he was acclaimed as a national hero during the last decade of his life.

Life 
Lockett was born in the small Victorian town of Waanyarra, near Bendigo. He left school at the age of 9 to work on a local farm. Later, he worked for his uncles in The Mallee. On 24 March 1916, he travelled to Mildura to enlist in the Australian Imperial Force. He served in France with the 38th Battalion, earning promotion to sergeant and was discharged on 20 September 1919.

After the war, Lockett returned to The Mallee and selected a  block of land in Linga, Victoria, deciding to make his living as a farmer. In 1923, he married Maybell Ingwerson and they had four children together. In 1963, the couple retired to Bendigo, leaving the farmland (which now covered more than ), in the care of their children and grandchildren.

After turning 100, Lockett was regarded in Australia as a "legend", "noted not only for his remarkable lucidity and age, but as one of Australia's few surviving World War I veterans." In 1998, Lockett and his known fellow surviving veterans were awarded Chevalier (Knight) of the Légion d'honneur by the French government for their service in the war. The ceremony was held in Lockett's home town of Bendigo, attended by Prime Minister John Howard, who described Lockett as a "priceless national treasure .... who represents so much of what is the true Australian spirit ... courage ... adventure ... a willingness to share adversity". In 2000, at the age of 109, Lockett participated in the 2000 Olympic Torch Relay. On 11 June 2001, he was awarded the Medal of the Order of Australia for service to the community of Bendigo, particularly as a representative of Australia war veterans. Lockett died of kidney failure at age 111 years, 123 days, just three days after fellow supercentenarian Christina Cock, the oldest woman and person ever in Australia and Oceania. Lockett was the oldest man and Freemason ever in Australia and in Oceania. He was honoured with a state funeral, and described as "a hero of the nation", who "was indeed the quintessential Australian battler. Whatever hand of cards fate dealt him, his response was, `No worries.' "

At the time of his death, he was survived by four children: Jack, Kevin, Joyce, and Ron; fifteen grandchildren; and twenty-four great-grandchildren. He was Australia's oldest verified male until 2021 when Dexter Kruger set a new national record. Jack was also amongst the world's 100 oldest verified males until 2021.

Honours and awards 

Medal of the Order of Australia (awarded 11 June 2001)
British War Medal
Victory Medal
80th Anniversary Armistice Remembrance Medal (awarded 21 April 1999)
Centenary Medal (awarded 1 January 2002)
Chevalier (Knight) of the Légion d'honneur (awarded 4 July 1998)

References

External links 
Personal Stories: John "Jack" Lockett – Victorians At War project page (includes photographs)
"Australia Farewells Our Oldest Digger", Department of Veterans Affairs press release.
"Farewell to a gentle veteran", Meaghan Shaw, The Age, 2002-05-27. Accessed 2005-10-25.
"Vale Jack Lockett: a zest for life for 111 years", Farah Farouque, The Age, 2002-05-31. Accessed 2005-10-25.
Another Kind of Survival – The Story Of Jack Lockett – Radio National catalogue summary. Accessed 2005-10-25.
Jack Lockett – Transcript of interview by Ina Bertrand – an interview in Bendigo on 2000-12-13. Accessed 2005-10-25.
National Archives of Australia Service Record of Sgt J.H. Lockett, Regt Number 1194
 Australian War Memorial: John Henry (Jack) Lockett (1194) (Sergeant), 38th Battalion AIF, 1916–1919 interviewed by Peter Rubinstein. Accessed 2018-11-21

1891 births
2002 deaths
Australian Army soldiers
Australian military personnel of World War I
Australian supercentenarians
Men supercentenarians
Chevaliers of the Légion d'honneur
People from Victoria (Australia)
Recipients of the Medal of the Order of Australia
Recipients of the Centenary Medal
Deaths from kidney failure